Tasmanian soccer clubs from the regional divisions, competed in 2012 for the Milan Lakoseljac Memorial Trophy.  This knockout competition was won by Glenorchy Knights, their third title.

Preliminary Round 

A total of 16 teams took part in this stage of the competition.
All matches were completed by 12 March 2012.

The draw was as follows:

First round
A total of 16 teams took part in this stage of the competition.
All matches were completed by 9 April 2012.

The draw was as follows:

Quarter finals

A total of 8 teams took part in this stage of the competition.  All matches in this round were completed by 5 May 2012.

The draw was as follows:

Semi finals

A total of 4 teams took part in this stage of the competition. All matches in this round were completed by 27 May 2012. The draw was as follows:

Final 

The 2012 Milan Lakoseljac Memorial Trophy was held at the neutral venue of KGV Park on 11 June. Earlier in the day Olympia Warriors won the Women's Cup, and Clarence United won the Under 19s Cup.

References 

Milan Lakoseljac Cup
Milan Lakoseljac Memorial Trophy